Turtle Creek is a community Southwest of Riverview, in Albert County, New Brunswick. The community is located on named after the Turtle Creek and is located on Route 910.

History

As of Summer 2011, traffic to Turtle Creek has increased due to the recent construction of wind turbines.  In 1866 Turtle Creek was a farming community with approximately 35 families: Robert Mitton and Peter Jonah were mill owners here: in 1871 it had a population of 150: in 1898 Turtle Creek was a station on the Salisbury and Hillsborough Railway and had 1 post office and a population of 100: formerly called Fourche à Crapaud by Acadian settlers.

Turtle Creek Reservoir 
The Turtle Creek Reservoir located in the community that services water to Metro Moncton.

Notable people

See also
List of communities in New Brunswick

References

Bordering communities

Communities in Albert County, New Brunswick
Communities in Greater Moncton